Rummana Hussain (1952–1999) was an artist and one of the pioneers of conceptual art, installation, and politically engaged art in India.

Biography
Hussain was born in Bangalore, India to a prominent Muslim family. She was the sister of Wajahat Habibullah and wife of Ishaat Hussain. For much of her career, Hussain worked in oil and watercolor. She created largely allegorical figurative paintings. Her art underwent a significant transformation, however, after the events of 1992 in Ayodhya, India – a conflict between Hindu and Muslim communities which led to the destruction of the Babri Masjid.  In response to the communal violence of the events, as well as to her sudden exposure to ideological assault as a Muslim, Hussain's art not only became more explicitly political as well as personal, but it moved away from traditional media towards installation, video, photography, and mixed-media work. Throughout the 1990s, Hussain participated in exhibitions and events organized by SAHMAT, the Safdar Hashmi Memorial Trust, alongside other politically conscious artists and performers. She was invited to be an artist-in-residence at Art in General in New York City, in 1998, just a year before she died, at age 47, after a battle with cancer. Hussain's work has been on view in exhibitions and art fairs worldwide, including at Tate Modern, in London, National Gallery of Modern Art (NGMA), in Mumbai, Smart Museum, in Chicago, the 3rd Asia Pacific Triennial, in Brisbane, Australia, and at Talwar Gallery, which represents the estate of the artist. Her work is included in the permanent collection of the Queensland Art Gallery , in Queensland, Australia.

Work

Hussain is cited as one of the foremost leaders in the development of conceptual art in India, and is credited with bringing the possibilities and merits of diverse media to critical and popular attention. Despite her association with conceptual art, however, Hussain's work remains grounded in the physical using, rather than ignoring, the "sensuousness" of the various materials that make up her installations. Critics often reference this emphasis on materiality in the discussion of the social, specifically feminist, concerns of much of Hussain's oeuvre which acknowledges female corporeality as its starting point. Several of her video and performance-based pieces, for example, center on Hussain's own body – a tactic that positions her work at a unique juncture between the political and personal, the public and private. According to art historian Geeta Kapur, Hussain "makes [female and religious identity] matter in a conscious and dialectical way…she not only pitches her identity for display, she [also] constructs a public space for debate." Hussain's work both establishes an effective relationship with the viewer, and challenges him or her to act.

Notable exhibitions

Solo exhibitions 

2016, Talwar Gallery, Breaking Skin, New York, NY, US
2015, Talwar Gallery, Breaking Skin, New Delhi, India
2012, Talwar Gallery, New York, NY, US
2010, Talwar Gallery, Fortitude from Fragments, New Delhi, India
1998, Art in General, In Order to Join, New York, NY, US
1994, Gallery Chemould, Fragments/Multiples, Mumbai, India, and traveled to L.T.G. Gallery, New Delhi, India
1991, Centre for Contemporary Art, New Delhi, India
1991, Jehangir Art Gallery, Bombay, India
1986, Shridharani Gallery, New Delhi, India
1984, Triveni Gallery, New Delhi, India
1983, Academy of Fine Arts, Calcutta, India

Group exhibitions 

2019, 58th Venice Biennale, Our time for a future sharing, India Pavilion, Venice, Italy
2014, Kiran Nadar Museum of Art, Is it what you think?, New Delhi, India
2013, Smart Museum, The Sahmat Collective: Art and Activism in India Since 1989, Chicago, IL, US
2009, Talwar Gallery, Excerpts from Diary Pages, New York, NY, US
2009, Safdar Hashmi Memorial Trust (SAHMAT), IMAGE MUSIC TEXT, SAHMAT (20 Years), New Delhi, India
2007, Rose Art Museum, Tiger by the Tail!, Waltham, MA, US and travel to

Lowe Art Museum, Miami, FL, US
Katzen Arts Center, Washington, D.C., US
The Jane Voorhees Zimmerli Art Museum, New Brunswick, NJ, US
Arthur Ross Gallery, University of Pennsylvania, Philadelphia, PA, US

2004, Art Gallery of Western Australia, Edge of Desire: Recent Art in India, Perth, Australia, and travel to

National Gallery of Modern Art (NGMA), Mumbai, India
Museum of Contemporary Art (MARCO), Monterrey, Mexico
Tamayo Museum, Mexico City, Mexico
Asia Society, New York, NY, US

2002, Vancouver Art Gallery, Moving Ideas: A Contemporary Cultural Dialogue with India, Vancouver, Canada
2001, Tate Modern, Century City, London, UK
1999, Queensland Art Gallery, The Third Asia Pacific Triennial, Queensland, Australia
1997, Victoria Art Gallery, Telling Tales, British Council, Bath, UK
1997, Royal Norwegian Embassy, Crosscurrents: Museums of Ethnography, New Delhi, India
1997, Mills College Art Museum, Women Artists of India: A Celebration of Independence, Oakland, CA, US
1995, Safdar Hashmi Memorial Trust (SAHMAT), Postcards for Gandhi, New Delhi, India
1995, Middlesbrough Institute of Modern Art, Inside Out: Contemporary Women Artists of India, Middlesbrough, UK
1993, Husain Ki Sarai, Exhibition in Aid of Earthquake Victims, Faridabad, India
1992, Safdar Hashmi Memorial Trust (SAHMAT), Images and Words, New Delhi, India
1992, Tata Centre, Calcutta, India

Performance and video 

1998, Art in General, Residency, New York, NY, US
1997, Artspace Studios, Residency, Bristol, UK
1996, Ministry of Human Resource Development Senior Fellowship (Visual Arts), New Delhi, India

Personal life
Rummana was married to Ishaat Hussain, an Indian businessman and former interim chairman of Tata Consultancy Services (TCS). They have a daughter, Shazmeen, who married Shaad Ali, son of politician Subhashini Ali and Bollywood filmmaker Muzaffar Ali, in 2006 (div. 2011). She's currently married to and has a child with Rustom Lawyer.

Death
Rummana died of Cancer on 5 July 1999. She was 47.

References

External links 
Art India, "Look Back in Anger," August 2019
Artforum, January 2016.
Rummana Hussain in the permanent collection of the Queensland Art Gallery.
Art India, The Courage of Being Rummana, January–April 1999.
The New York Times, Rummana Hussain, 47, Indian Conceptual Artist, 18 July 1999.
The New York Times, Rummana Hussain, 23 October 1998.
The New York Times, Rummana Hussain: In Order to Join, 16 October 1998.

1952 births
1999 deaths
20th-century Indian Muslims
Women artists from Karnataka
Political artists
Artists from Bangalore
20th-century Indian women artists
20th-century Indian painters
Women installation artists
Women video artists
Painters from Karnataka